Piestinae are a subfamily of Staphylinidae.

Anatomy
Body elongate and depressed, abdomen parallel-sided.
Antennae inserted under shelf-like corners of frons
Tarsi 5-5-5

Ecology
Habitat: many species under bark of decaying trees.
Collection method: barking.
Biology: some are saprophages or mycophages.

Systematics
Piestinae includes three genera and five species in North America. These three genera belong to the subfamily:
 Hypotelus Erichson, 1839 i c g
 Piestus Gravenhorst, 1806 i c g b
 Siagonium Kirby & Spence, 1815 i c g b
Data sources: i = ITIS, c = Catalogue of Life, g = GBIF, b = Bugguide.net

References
Newton, A. F., Jr., M. K. Thayer, J. S. Ashe, and D. S. Chandler. 2001. 22. Staphylinidae Latreille, 1802. p. 272–418. In: R. H. Arnett, Jr., and M. C. Thomas (eds.). American beetles, Volume 1. CRC Press; Boca Raton, Florida. ix + 443 p.

References

External links

Piestinae at Bugguide.net. 

 
Beetles described in 1839
Beetle subfamilies